The Mathias Corvinus Collegium (MCC) is a college of advanced studies located in Budapest, Hungary. Founded in 1996, it was initially directed at university students in the arts and social sciences. It serves as a student dormitory, scholarship program and a private educational institution. It confers no degrees, but rather provides supplementary training to students already enrolled in degree courses. Programs are generally free of charge, but admission is highly selective. The leader of MCC's main board, Balázs Orbán, helped plan the transfer in his concurrent role as state secretary in the office of Hungarian Prime Minister Viktor Orbán (no relation).

In 2020, the MCC received an influx of Hungarian government funds and assets valued at US$ 1.7 billion (equal to about 1% of Hungary's gross domestic product). Due to its close ties to Viktor Orbán's government, its critics describe MCC as a "breeding ground for future Fidesz-friendly elites."

Programs

University programs 
University students enrolled in regular training in fields that are covered by the MCC's six Schools (Law, International Relations, Economics, Media, Social Sciences and History and Psychology) are eligible for MCC's flagship program.

Budapest Fellowships 
In 2021, MCC and the Hungary Initiatives Foundation, based in Washington, D.C., jointly established the Budapest Fellowship Programme, a 10-month exchange for young US-based scholars to work and research in Budapest. Participants would do research at the National University of Public Service and various other institutions documenting Hungary's history and politics.

High school and elementary school programs 
In 2021, the MCC said it plans to expand its programs to 10,000 high school and elementary school students in 35 European cities with Hungarian populations.

Locations 
The initial location, the former Workers' Militia headquarters on Budapest's Gellért Hill, was gradually expanded to include Balassi Institute's premises. On 6 January 2021, MCC announced a public procurement tender for a new build at the Gellért Hill site, replacing the current buildings.

In 2021, a new site in Debrecen was selected for expansion. There are regional centers in Cluj-Napoca, Szeged, Miskolc, Pécs and Győr.

Governance 
The MCC is governed by a foundation. Members are appointed for life, and only the current members can choose new members. The leader of its main board is Balázs Orbán, who is also state secretary in the office of Viktor Orbán, the prime minister of Hungary.

Controversy 
Some commentators regard the MCC as being closely linked to the Orbán government. In 2020, the National Assembly apportioned a 10% shareholding in each of MOL and Gedeon Richter to the MCC's endowment, valued at US$ 1.3 billion, plus $462 million in cash and $9 million of property. This was seen as controversial as many of the MCC's leading personalities are associated with Fidesz and the inner circle around PM Viktor Orbán.

References

Further reading 
 

Universities and colleges in Hungary
Budapest
1996 establishments in Hungary
Educational institutions established in 1996